Rabal may refer to:

 Rabal (Portugal), a Portuguese parish in the district of Bragança
 Dr. Rabal, a fictitious character in the Star Trek series The Next Generation